was a Japanese daimyō of the early Edo period, who ruled the Hasunoike Domain in Hizen Province (modern-day Saga Prefecture). He was the son of Nabeshima Katsushige, and was a viable candidate for succession to the lordship of the Saga Domain upon the death of his brother Tadanao (Naozumi married Tadanao's widow); however, this plan was unsuccessful. Naozumi was instead granted 52,000 koku in Hizen Province, and became the first daimyō of Hasunoike.

References
 Naozumi on Nekhet's "World Nobility" site (14 September 2007)

1616 births
1669 deaths
Tozama daimyo
Nabeshima clan